The 2004 2. divisjon season was the third highest football (soccer) league for men in Norway.

26 games were played in 4 groups, with 3 points given for wins and 1 for draws. Tønsberg, Follo, Løv-Ham and Alta were promoted to the First Division. Number twelve, thirteen and fourteen were relegated to the 3. divisjon. The winning teams from each of the 24 groups in the 3. divisjon each faced a winning team from another group in a playoff match, resulting in 12 playoff winners which were promoted to the 2. divisjon.

League tables

Group 1

Group 2

Group 3

Group 4

Top goalscorers
 34 goals:
  Simon Sjöfors, Kvik Halden
 32 goals:
  Vegard Alstad Sunde, Levanger
 24 goals:
  Johan Nås, Lørenskog
 23 goals:
  Armin Sistek, Odd Grenland 2
  Jørn Holmen, Steinkjer
  Jørn Hansen, Alta
  Kim Nysted, Bærum
 21 goals:
  Lars Petter Hansen, Tønsberg
 20 goals:
  Ørjan Låstad, Åsane
  Vegard Olsen, Strindheim
 19 goals:
  Morten Romsdalen, Tollnes
  Oddmund Vaagsholm, Follo

Promotion playoff

References
Fixtures and table, group 1
Fixtures and table, group 2
Fixtures and table, group 3
Fixtures and table, group 4
Goalscorers

Norwegian Second Division seasons
3
Norway
Norway